Rajya Rani trains are a series of express trains operated by Indian Railways to connect state capitals with other cities important for tourism, pilgrimage or business.

History 
The word "Rajya" means "State" and the word "Rani" means Queen in Sanskrit and several Indian languages. The Rajya Rani trains were announced by the railway minister in railway budget 2011. The first Rajya Rani train was started between Mysore and Bangalore by Railway Minister Mamata Banerjee and was flagged off on 1 July 2011 by K. H. Muniyappa, Minister of State for Railways.

Etymology 
The train was named after Maharani Gayatri Devi, former princess of the state of Cooch Behar, Maharani of Jaipur. She was one of the world's 10 most beautiful women on the Vogue list. She shares space with the likes of Rabindranath Tagore (Kavi Guru Express) and Swami Vivekananda (Vivek Express) as the railways has named a series of trains as Rajya Rani Expresses to honour the late Rajmata of Jaipur.

On 22 May 2017, the Dadar-Sawantwadi Rajya Rani Express was named as "Tutari Express" to mark the centenary of Keshavasuta's famed poem titled "Tutari".

Active Services

See also 

Rajdhani Express
Shatabdi Express
 Duronto Express

 Kavi Guru Express
Vivek Express
Yuva Express

References 

Railway services introduced in 2011